Pearson's may refer to:

 Pearson's Candy Company, chocolate and confectionery manufacturer
 Pearson's Magazine, a British literary magazine
 Pearson's Magazine (US), an American version of the British magazine of the same name
 Pearson product-moment correlation coefficient, commonly referred to as "Pearson's r"
Pearson's chi-squared test, a statistical procedure whose results are evaluated by reference to the chi-square distribution
Pearson's Chapel, Texas, a former town in Texas, United States

See also
Pearson (disambiguation)